Beneath the Valley of The Rage is a 2007-2008 comic book limited series prequel based on the 2007 independent horror film The Rage.

Publication history
Beneath the Valley of The Rage was initially published as a monthly four-issue comic book limited series by Fangoria Comics. The first issue was published in June 2007. The series saw three of the four planned issues released prior to Fangoria Comics sudden closing.

Beneath the Valley of The Rage was re-released by The Scream Factory in April 2008 in its complete four-issue format, allowing readers to complete the series for the first time.

Plot synopsis
Dr. V is intent on bringing the world to its knees by infecting it with his Rage serum and transforming all of mankind into mutated, murderous monsters.

Film adaptation

Beneath the Valley of The Rage is a prequel to the Robert Kurtzman film The Rage

Notes

References

External links
 Robert Kurtzman's Beneath the Valley of the Rage 1 (Nightmare Noir Edition), 2, 3 and 4 at Wowio.com

Comics based on films